The , is a river in Saitama Prefecture, Japan.
The river rises from Mount Ōmochi in Hannō, Saitama and flows to the Arakawa River at Kawagoe, Saitama.

References

External links

Rivers of Saitama Prefecture
Rivers of Japan